James R. Merry (August 21, 1927 – February 1, 2001) was a Republican member of the Pennsylvania House of Representatives.

References

External links
James R. Merry's obituary

Republican Party members of the Pennsylvania House of Representatives
1927 births
2001 deaths
20th-century American politicians